The  is a mythical Japanese yōkai (ghost, phantom, or strange apparition) from western Japan.

It is supposedly a large ghostly skeleton whale and is said to be accompanied by strange birds and fish.

Legends 
In one story, a fisherman tries to catch it with his harpoon but the harpoon sailed right through it and the Bake-kujira floated away. In other stories people say that the Bake-kujira brings a curse and general misfortune to the area where it is spotted.

External links 
Bakekujira and Japan's Whale Cults at hyakumonogatari.com (English).

Japanese mythology
Legendary mammals
Fictional whales
Water spirits
Yōkai

pt:Anexo:Lista de artigos mínimos de Youkais#Bake-kujira